The 801st Radar Squadron is an inactive United States Air Force unit. It was last assigned to the 28th Air Division, Aerospace Defense Command, stationed at Malmstrom Air Force Base, Montana. It was inactivated on 1 July 1974.

The unit was a General Surveillance Radar squadron providing for the air defense of the United States.

Lineage
 Constituted as the 801st Aircraft Control and Warning Squadron on 6 July 1955
 Activated on 8 October 1955
 Redesignated 801st Radar Squadron (SAGE), 1 March 1961
 Inactivated on 31 December 1969
 Activated on 30 June 1971
 Inactivated on 1 July 1974

Assignments
 29th Air Division, 1 February 1956
 Great Falls Air Defense Sector, 1 July 1960
 28th Air Division, 1 April 1966 - 31 December 1969
 28th Air Division, 30 June 1971 - 1 July 1974

Stations
 Malmstrom AFB, MT, 1 February 1956 - 31 December 1969
 Malmstrom AFB, MT, 30 June 1971 - 1 July 1974

References

 Cornett, Lloyd H. and Johnson, Mildred W., A Handbook of Aerospace Defense Organization  1946 - 1980,  Office of History, Aerospace Defense Center, Peterson AFB, CO (1980).
 Winkler, David F. & Webster, Julie L., Searching the Skies, The Legacy of the United States Cold War Defense Radar Program,  US Army Construction Engineering Research Laboratories, Champaign, IL (1997).

External links

Radar squadrons of the United States Air Force
Aerospace Defense Command units